The Milan amphitheatre was a Roman amphitheatre in the ancient city of Mediolanum, the modern Milan in northern Italy.

History
The amphitheatre was built near the Porta Ticinese in the 2nd–3rd centuries AD, when Mediolanum grew as economical and political importance while Rome declined. It remained in use until the city was one of the capitals of the Western Roman Empire (4th or 5th centuries). Later it was abandoned after Christianity imposed an end to arena games, but also as, in the wake of the imperial crisis, animals to be used in the amphitheatre were no longer imported. It became a quarry for construction stones as early as the 4th century AD, when the Basilica of San Lorenzo was built.

The edifice was demolished during a barbarian attack on Milan, as it was located outside the walls and could therefore be used as stronghold by the attackers. The date of the event is uncertain, however: it could be 402, during the Visigothic invasion of Italy, or in 452, when northern Italy was ravaged by Attila, or during the Gothic Wars (6th century).

Structure
The arena measured .

See also
 List of Roman amphitheatres

References

Sources

External links
Ancient Roman Milan

Buildings and structures completed in the 3rd century
Roman amphitheatres in Italy
Amphitheatre
Tourist attractions in Milan
Ruins in Italy